Nils Stump (born 12 April 1997) is a Swiss judoka. He is a bronze medalist at the 2021 European Judo Championships held in Lisbon, Portugal. He also competed at the 2020 Summer Olympics in Tokyo, Japan.

Career
In 2021, he won one of the bronze medals in the men's 73 kg event at the European Judo Championships held in Lisbon, Portugal.

He also competed in the men's 73 kg event at the 2021 World Judo Championships held in Budapest, Hungary. In July 2021, he competed in the men's 73 kg event at the 2020 Summer Olympics in Tokyo, Japan where he was eliminated in his first match.

In october 2022, he won the 2022 Abu Dhabi Grand Slam and he became the first swiss judoka to win a Grand Slam tournament in the IJF World Tour.

Achievements

References

External links
 
 

Living people
1997 births
Place of birth missing (living people)
Swiss male judoka
Judoka at the 2019 European Games
European Games competitors for Switzerland
Judoka at the 2020 Summer Olympics
Olympic judoka of Switzerland
21st-century Swiss people